The Krynka is a river in Ukraine, 180 km in length, a right tributary of the Mius, in the basin of the Sea of Azov. The Krynka finds its source in Luhansk Oblast.

References

 Географічна енциклопедія України: в 3-х томах / Редколегія: О. М. Маринич (відпов. ред.) та ін. — К.: «Українська радянська енциклопедія» імені М. П. Бажана, 1989.

Drainage basins of the Sea of Azov
Rivers of Luhansk Oblast
Rivers of Rostov Oblast